Eynallah Kandi (also Romanized as ʿEynallah Kandī; also known as Beyg Bāghlū) is a village in Arshaq-e Shomali Rural District, Arshaq District, Meshgin Shahr County, Ardabil Province, Iran. At the 2006 census, its population was 161, in 29 families.

References 

Towns and villages in Meshgin Shahr County